Polish dialects are regional vernacular varieties of the Polish language.

Four major dialect groups are typically recognized, each primarily associated with a particular geographical region, and often further subdivided into subdialectal groups (termed gwara in Polish). They are:
 Greater Polish, spoken in the west
 Lesser Polish, spoken in the south and southeast
 Masovian, spoken throughout the central and eastern parts of the country
 Silesian spoken in the southwest (sometimes also considered a separate language, see comment below)

The regional differences correspond mainly to old ethnic or tribal divisions from around a thousand years ago. As a result of 19th century measures taken by occupying powers, of expulsions plus other displacements of Poles during and after World War II, as well as language policy in the Polish People's Republic, supplemented by broadcast media, the Polish language has become more homogeneous than ever before in the second half of the 20th century.

Traditionally two additional dialect groups were treated alongside the aforementioned, adding to a total of six.
These varieties have been put at risk of extinction due to historic geopolitical population movements. They are: 
Northern Kresy, spoken along the border between Lithuania and Belarus
Southern Kresy, spoken in isolated pockets in Ukraine

Dialect and language distinctions 
Although traditional linguistic divisions continue to be cited, especially in Polish sources, the current linguistic consensus tends to consider Kashubian a separate language, or at least as a distinct lect that cannot be grouped at the same level as the four major modern Polish dialects. Prior to World War II, Kashubian speakers were mainly surrounded by German speakers, with only a narrow border to the south with Polish speakers. Kashubian contains a number of features not found in other Polish dialects, e.g. nine distinct oral vowels (vs. the six of standard Polish), evolution of the Proto-Slavic TorT group to TarT (a feature not found in any other Slavic language) and (in the northern dialects) phonemic word stress, an archaic feature preserved from Common Slavic times and not found anywhere else among the West Slavic languages.

The two Kresy dialects are spoken in Kresy, the former eastern Polish territories annexed by the Soviet Union in 1945 and currently absorbed into Lithuania, Belarus and the Ukraine. Both dialect groups have been in decline since World War II as a result of expulsions of millions of Poles from Kresy. Poles living in Lithuania (particularly in the Vilnius region), in Belarus (particularly in the northwest), and in northeast Poland continue to speak the Northern Kresy dialect, which sounds (in Polish described as zaciąganie z ruska) as if speaking with a Russian drawl, and is quite distinctive.

The majority of Poles expelled from Kresy were settled in newly annexed regions in northern and western Poland, and thereby their manner of speech evolved into so-called new mixed dialects. However, among the declining older generation there are still traces of Kresy dialect with its characteristic Ukrainian or Rusyn sounds, especially in the use of the Russian "L" where standard Polish uses "Ł" and of elongated vowels.

Silesian 
Many linguistic sources relating to the Slavic languages describe Silesian as a dialect of Polish. However, many Silesians consider themselves a separate ethnicity and have been advocating the recognition of Silesian as a distinct language. According to the last official census in Poland in 2011, over 500 thousand people declared Silesian as their native language. Many sociolinguistic sources (e.g. Tomasz Kamusella assert that the determination between a language or a dialect is ultimately a matter of extralinguistic criteria, such as national attachment or the political attitudes of its users, and this changes over time. See: Agnieszka Pianka, Alfred F. Majewicz, Tomasz Wicherkiewicz<ref>[Języki świata i ich klasyfikowanie"] (en: "Languages of the world and their classification"), Polish Scientific Publishers, Warszawa 1989</ref>) Language organizations such as SIL International and various linguistic resources such as Ethnologue, and Poland's Ministry of Administration and Digitization, recognize Silesian as a distinct language. In 2007, Silesian was assigned its language code szl within the ISO 639-3 standard.

List of dialects

Greater Polish dialect

Derived from the Western Slavic language spoken by the Polans, the subdialects are:
 Krajna dialect
 Tuchola dialect
 Kociewie dialect
 Chełmno-Dobrzyń
 Cuyavian dialect
 Chojno (Southern Greater Poland) dialect

Mazovian dialect

Derived from the language of the MazoviansHalina Karas, Gwary Polskie, Dialects and gwary in Poland 
 Białystok dialect
 Suwałki dialect
 Warmia dialect
 Kurpie dialect
 Masurian dialect
 Malbork-Lubawa dialect
 Ostróda dialect
 Near Mazovian dialect
 Far Mazovian dialect

Lesser Polish dialect

Derived from the language of the Vistulans, is the most numerous dialectal group in modern Poland. It includes the following sub-groups
 Łowicz dialect
 Sieradz-Łęczyca dialect
 Holy Cross Mountains dialects, often associated with the ancient tribe of the Lędzianie
 Lasowian dialect
The Goral dialects (the colloquial name for the many dialects spoken by Gorals) which include mainly:
 Orawa dialect
 Spisz dialect
 Podhale dialect
 Żywiec dialect

Silesian dialect

Silesian, derived from the language of the Slavic tribe called, Ślężanie , in modern times spoken in the regions of Upper Silesia. The United States Immigration Commission in its "Dictionary of races or peoples" published in 1911 counted Silesian as one of the dialects of Polish.

 Cieszyn Silesian dialect
Niemodlin Silesian dialect
Gliwice Silesian dialect
Jabłonków Silesian dialect
Kluczbork Silesian dialect
Prudnik Silesian dialect
Opole Silesian dialect
Sulkovian Silesian dialect

Those who regard Silesian as a separate language tend to include the Lach dialects of the Czech Republic as part of this language. However, the standard linguistic sources on Slavic languages normally describe them as dialects of the Czech language,or sometimes as transitional Polish–Czech dialects.David Short (1994). "Czech". The Slavonic Languages, edited by Bernard Comrie and Greville G. Corbett. Routledge. P. 530.

Northern Borderlands dialect
In modern times the dialect is still spoken mainly by the Polish minorities in Lithuania and in northwestern Belarus.
 Wilno dialect

Southern Borderlands dialect
Often considered a derivative of a mixture of Old Polish and Old Ruthenian, as was spoken in Red Ruthenia in the Middle Ages.
See especially, the Lwów dialect'', .

New mixed dialects 

 Northern new mixed dialect 
 Northwestern new mixed dialect
 Southern new mixed dialect

References